The following is a list of unproduced Darren Aronofsky projects in roughly chronological order. During his long career, American film director Darren Aronofsky has worked on a number of projects which never progressed beyond the pre-production stage under his direction. Some of these projects fell in "development hell" or were cancelled.

1990s

Ronin 
Eleven days after the release of Pi, his first film, Aronofsky signed a deal with New Line Cinema in July 1998 to direct a film adaptation of Frank Miller's Ronin comic book series. Frank Miller, the author of the comic book, was attached to write the script. However, the project never materialized and Aronofsky left it to direct Requiem for a Dream.

2000s

Sector 7 
On May 24, 2000, Aronofsky was announced to direct a film adaptation of David Wiesner's Sector 7 for Nickelodeon Movies. Eric Watson was attached to produce the film. However, the project finally fell into development hell, and Aronofsky moved to other projects.

Batman: Year One 
On September 21, 2000, Variety reported that Aronofsky had signed a deal with Warner Bros. to direct a fifth Batman film based on Frank Miller's acclaimed comic book Batman: Year One, with Miller attached to write the script, with Eric Watson attached to produce and with Aronofsky's frequent collaborator Matthew Libatique to work on it. The film was intended to be a reboot of the film series, after the failure of Batman & Robin in 1997, although Warner Bros. originally planned to release the film as a prequel of Tim Burton's Batman. Christian Bale, who later portrayed Batman in Christopher Nolan's The Dark Knight Trilogy was attached to star in the lead role. Gillian B. Loeb was supposed to be the main antagonist of the film, replacing Carmine Falcone as the head of Gotham City's mafia. Aronofsky also planned to film the movie in Ciudad Vieja, Montevideo, Uruguay. However, on June 30, 2002, Aronofsky and Miller finally left the project due to other commitments. A reboot of the Batman film series was finally released in 2005 as Batman Begins and directed by Christopher Nolan.

Flicker 
On January 28, 2003, Aronofsky was reported to direct a film adaptation of Theodore Roszak's novel Flicker. Fight Club screenwriter Jim Uhls was attached to write the script. However, on February 15, 2006, Variety reported that Aronofsky left the project and moved to Universal Pictures.

Watchmen 
In July 2004, Aronofsky was hired by Paramount Pictures to direct a film adaptation of Watchmen, with David Hayter as writer (who wrote the script in October 2001) and with Lawrence Gordon, Lloyd Levin and Eric Watson as producers. However, at the end, Aronofsky left the project due to scheduling contracts with The Fountain. The film was eventually released in 2009 directed by Zack Snyder.

Black Flies 
In August 2006, Aronofsky was hired to direct the film adaptation of Shannon Burke’s Black Flies with Todd Kessler as writer and Paramount Pictures producing the film. The film would eventually be directed by Jean-Stéphane Sauvaire.

The Fighter 
On March 26, 2007, Aronofsky announced that he was attached to direct The Fighter, a biographical film based on the life of professional boxer Micky Ward. Scott Silver was attached to write the script. However, on July 25, 2008, Collider reported that Aronofsky left the project in favor of directing the RoboCop remake. The film was finally released in 2010 and directed by David O. Russell.

RoboCop 
On July 9, 2008, The Hollywood Reporter reported that MGM was in talks with Aronofsky to direct the long time planned RoboCop remake that was first announced in 2005. Sixteen days later, it was announced during the San Diego Comic-Con International 2008 that Aronofsky would direct the film with David Self attached to write it, leaving the production of Paramount Pictures' The Fighter. On June 12, 2009, it was reported that the film would be released in 2011. However, in July 2009, during the San Diego Comic-Con, MGM reported that the project was slowing down due scheduling conflicts with Aronofsky. Finally, on March 2, 2011, it was reported by Internet Movie Database that Brazilian director José Padilha would direct the film instead of Aronofsky. The film was finally released in 2014 and directed by Padilha.

Breaking the Bank 
On September 21, 2009, Darren Aronofsky was in talks to direct the Lee Murray biopic Breaking the Bank from a script by Kelly Williamson. On May 4, 2012, Gareth Evans replaced Aronofsky as director and XYZ Films will produce and Universal Pictures as distribute the film.

2010s

Serena 
In February 2010, it was announced that Angelina Jolie would star in the film adaptation of Ron Rash’s Serena, with Aronofsky set to direct and Chris Kyles's script. However, both Jolie and Aronofsky dropped out, leading to Bradley Cooper and Jennifer Lawrence to star and Susanne Bier directed the adaptation.

Jackie 
In April 2010, it was announced that Rachel Weisz would star as the title character, with Aronofsky set to direct Jackie, from Noah Oppenheim script. However, both Weisz and Aronofsky dropped out after they ended their romantic relationship and Pablo Larrain took over directing the movie.

The Tiger 
In May 2010, it was announced that Brad Pitt would star and produce the film adaptation of John Vaillant’s novel The Tiger, with Aronofsky set to direct and produce the film and Guillermo Arriaga writing the script. However, both Pitt and Aronofsky dropped out as star and director, respectively, and Alexander Skarsgard and Dane DeHaan were attached to star and Myroslav Slaboshpytskyi took over directing the movie.

Superman 
On September 28, 2010, MTV News reported that Aronofsky was in talks with Warner Bros. to direct a reboot of the Superman film series, after the lukewarm reception of Superman Returns in 2006. However, Aronofsky refused to direct it due his commitment with Wolverine 2. A reboot of the Superman film series was finally released in 2013 as Man of Steel and directed by Zack Snyder.

The Wolverine 
On October 13, 2010, SuperHeroHype.com reported that Aronofsky was in talks with 20th Century Fox to direct Wolverine 2, the sixth entry of the X-Men film series that started with X-Men and the planned sequel of Gavin Hood's poorly-received film X-Men Origins: Wolverine, after X-Men director Bryan Singer turned down the offer of directing the film in March 2010. Seven days later, Hugh Jackman confirmed via Vulture.com that Aronofsky would direct the film. On November 13, 2010, Aronofsky confirmed via Upprox that the film would be titled now The Wolverine. However, on March 17, 2011, The Hollywood Reporter reported that Aronofsky left the project because directing would have meant that he had to leave his country for a long time and be away from his family. The film was finally released in 2013 and directed by James Mangold.

Machine Man 
On October 26, 2010, Aronofsky reported that he would direct Max Barry’s novel Machine Man from a Mark Heyman script with Barry producing, for Mandalay Pictures.

Hobgoblin 
On March 16, 2011, one day before announcing his departure from The Wolverine film, Aronofsky reported via Deadline Hollywood that he would direct the pilot of a planned TV series entitled Hobgoblin for HBO. The series would have focused on the adventures of a group of magicians and con artists who use their powers of deception to defeat Adolf Hitler during World War II. Pulitzer Prize-winning author Michael Chabon and Chabon's wife Ayelet Waldman were attached to work on the project. However, Screen Crush reported on June 18, 2013 that Aronofsky was pulled out from the project.

Human Nature 
In May 2011, it was announced that Aronofsky was in talks to direct Joe Welsh’s sci-fi script “Human Nature,” with George Clooney in talks to star and Akiva Goldsman producing the film for Warner Bros. Pictures.

The General 
On April 17, 2012, Aronofsky reported that he would direct an Unforgiven-style George Washington movie The General from a script by Adam Cooper
and Bill Collage with Paramount Pictures in negotiations to develop the film.

Red Sparrow 
On August 14, 2013, Deadline.com reported that Aronofsky was in talks to direct a film adaptation of Jason Matthews' spy novel Red Sparrow, with Eric Warren Singer attached to write its script. However, The Hollywood Reporter later reported on January 16, 2014, that Aronofsky had abandoned the project. On June 9, 2014, it was announced that David Fincher would direct the film, although no release date was announced at the moment. The film was eventually produced with Francis Lawrence directing.

MaddAddam TV series
On June 4, 2014, Deadline reported that Aronofsky will produce the TV series based on Margaret Atwood’s MaddAddam trilogy and potentially direct for HBO. There have been no developments since.

Untitled artificial intelligence courtroom film
On July 17, 2017, Aronofsky reported that he will direct and produce a film from a Joe Epstein script, for Paramount Pictures, which was revealed to be a courtroom drama that focuses on artificial intelligence.

References 

Films directed by Darren Aronofsky
Aronofsky, Darren